Richard Clifford Taylor (born 28 January 1943) is an English musician, best known as the guitarist and founding member of the Pretty Things.

Taylor was an early bassist for the Rolling Stones, but left the band to resume his studies at Sidcup Art College. While there he formed the Pretty Things in September 1963. He now lives on the Isle of Wight, England.

Career

Taylor was born in Livingstone Hospital, Dartford, and attended Dartford Grammar School. In July 1962, while he was at Sidcup Art College, the Rolling Stones was formed when Taylor, Mick Jagger and Keith Richards' three-piece group Little Boy Blue and the Blue Boys joined Brian Jones and Ian Stewart's Rollin' Stones. Initially, Taylor played lead guitar in the band, but switched to bass to accommodate Jones. That November, Taylor left to return to art college, and his former bandmates posted an advertisement seeking another bassist. Bill Wyman responded, and succeeded him as the Rolling Stones' bassist in December 1962.

In 1963, Taylor formed the Pretty Things with vocalist Phil May, and once again played his preferred guitar position. He left the Pretty Things in 1969, after the release of their concept album S.F. Sorrow. The band released a few more albums without Taylor and disbanded in 1976, but regrouped with Taylor in 1979 to release Cross Talk. Taylor remained with the Pretty Things until they broke up in 2018.

In addition to his work with The Pretty Things, Taylor co-produced Hawkwind's debut album, on which he also played guitar, as well as Cochise's first album and Skin Alley's first album. His contribution to punk rock was a recording by Auntie Pus. During the second half of the 1980s, Taylor played guitar with the English post-punk band the Mekons. He recorded with Andre Williams in Chicago for George Paulus' St. George Records.

References

1943 births
Living people
20th-century English musicians
21st-century English musicians
People educated at Dartford Grammar School
English rock guitarists
English record producers
English songwriters
English rock musicians
British rhythm and blues boom musicians
Lead guitarists
Slide guitarists
People from Dartford
Musicians from Kent
The Rolling Stones members
The Mekons members
Pretty Things members